Constance Babington Smith MBE, FRSL (15 October 1912 – 31 July 2000) was a British journalist and writer, but is probably best known for her wartime work in imagery intelligence.

Early life
Constance Babington Smith was born on 15 October 1912 at Beech Law, Puttenham, Surrey. She was the daughter of the senior civil servant Sir Henry Babington Smith, a scion of the Babington family. Her mother, born Lady Elizabeth Bruce, was the eldest daughter of the 9th Earl of Elgin, making Constance a granddaughter of a Viceroy of India and a great-great-granddaughter of the man who bought the Elgin Marbles. Constance came from a large family and was the seventh of nine children. Her father died in 1923, when she was ten. By then, her eldest brothers were already adults, whilst her youngest sister was just two years old. 

She was educated at home at the family home 'Chinthurst', in Wonersh in Surrey. She finished her education in France and moved to London in adult life. A trained milliner, she worked for the milliner Aage Thaarup before the war and also Vogue magazine in London,

When her mother Elizabeth became ill in the 1930s, Constance Babington Smith had to move to Weybridge to take care of her, a role often expected of the oldest unmarried daughter in a family. Brooklands aerodrome was nearby and she began to watch motor and air racing there as a distraction from her domestic duties. This stimulated an interest in aviation. On 23 December 1936 she ventured in to journalism by writing her first article as 'Babs' for The Aeroplane magazine.

War service
Her knowledge of aircraft took her into the WAAF and photo intelligence in the Second World War. In December 1940, Babington Smith was in the fifth group of WAAFs trained in photographic interpretation in the top secret Photographic Development Unit, qualifying alongside  Eve Holiday, Sarah Oliver, (Winston Churchill's daughter) and Ann McKnight Kauffer (daughter of the poster artist Edward McKnight Kauffer), and Eve Holiday, initially based at Paduoc House, Wembley.

The work concentrated on ships but Babington Smith's expertise with aeroplanes led to her being asked in early 1941 to set up an aircraft recognition section. It was unusual for a WAAF officer to head her own section without an RAF officer alongside. A colleague there, Ursula Powys-Lybbe, later wrote that "Babs had sufficient strength of character, an extraordinary singleness of purpose together with total dedication to the task, mixed in with a modicum of determination necessary to be able to assume sole command of the new section" The unit moved from London in after multiple bombings and she served with the Central Interpretation Unit (CIU) at RAF Medmenham, Buckinghamshire, reaching the rank of Flight Officer. Serving alongside was her brother, Bernard Babington Smith (1905-1993), who was also a photo interpreter (PI) at Medmenham and head of the Night Photograph Section. 

In 1942 she made an uncredited appearance in the Air Ministry feature film Target for Tonight, along with her fellow Medmenham colleague, Sqn Ldr Peter Riddell.

Working on the interpretation of aerial reconnaissance photographs, Constance was credited with the discovery of the V1 at Peenemünde, Germany.

In 1942, Babington Smith was Mentioned in Dispatches for her work and in 1945 she was awarded the MBE. Her brother, Bernard, was also honoured for his work at the CIU, receiving the OBE.

By 1944 the aircraft recognition section had eleven staff.

She was portrayed in the 1965 film Operation Crossbow by Sylvia Syms.

After VE-Day Constance was attached to USAAF Intelligence in Washington, D.C. to continue her work on photographic interpretation, this time for the Pacific theatre.

In 1946, the United States awarded her the Legion of Merit.

Later life
From 1946 to 1950 she was a researcher for Life Magazine.  She later moved to Cambridge, Britain, where she converted to Greek Orthodoxy and become a writer and biographer.

Her war memoir Evidence in Camera was in 1957 the first comprehensive narrative of British photographic reconnaissance in the Second World War.  Because it was published before the revelation of wartime code-breaking, this book may also have contained a measure of Cold War disinformation.

Her cousin was the writer Rose Macaulay, Babington Smith writing a biography of her published in 1972.

She appeared in several episodes of the 1977 BBC TV series The Secret War, where she discussed her wartime work as a photo interpreter as it related to the subject of the episode.

Babington Smith was a founder and director of the Mosquito Memorial Appeal Fund, now the de Havilland Museum Trust.

Ancestry

Bibliography

 How Photographic Detectives Solved Secret Weapons Mystery (LIFE, 28 October 1957)
 Evidence In Camera (1957) - published as Air Spy in the US
 Testing Time (1961)
 Amy Johnson (1961)
 Rose Macaulay (1972)
 John Masefield; a Life (1978)
 Iulia de Beausobre (1983)
 Champion of Homeopathy: the Life of Margery Blackie (1986)

References

Further reading 

 

1912 births
2000 deaths
Writers from London
English journalists
20th-century English writers
English biographers
Recipients of the Legion of Merit
20th-century British women writers
Women's Auxiliary Air Force airwomen
English Eastern Orthodox Christians
20th-century biographers
Fellows of the Royal Society of Literature
Constance
Women biographers
People from Surrey